Nouveau-Bordeaux originally known as Bordeaux, is a neighbourhood in north end Montreal, Quebec, Canada located in the borough of Ahuntsic-Cartierville.

Nouveau-Bordeaux is bordered on the north by Rivière des Prairies, to the northeast by Ahuntsic, to the southeast by the borough of Saint-Laurent and to the southwest by the neighbourhood of Cartierville.               
Formerly an independent city, Bordeaux was annexed by the much larger city of Montreal in the year 1910, at the same time as neighboring Ahuntsic. The district had a large housing boom in the 1960s and 1970s. Galeries de Normandie shopping mall is located in Bordeaux' north.

External links
Ville de Montréal 

Neighbourhoods in Montreal
Ahuntsic-Cartierville